The 2011 Cincinnati Reds season was the 142nd season for the franchise in Major League Baseball, and their 9th at Great American Ball Park in Cincinnati.  The team attempted to return to the postseason for the second consecutive year following their NL Central division championship in 2010. Dusty Baker returned for his fourth year managing the Reds and his eighteenth season managed overall.

Offseason
The Reds off-season began with fans calling for a full-time power-hitting left-handed left fielder; a leadoff hitter; and a strong offensive shortstop as many were unhappy with the weak bat of Paul Janish. The Reds exercised the options of Jonny Gomes, while declining the options of Aaron Harang and Orlando Cabrera. They also exercised the option on Bronson Arroyo, but later signed him to a 3-year, $35 Million extension through 2013. They also extended 23-year-old right-fielder Jay Bruce for 6 yrs./ $51M. They resigned catcher Ramón Hernández, who will again team up with Ryan Hanigan in what was the 2nd best offensive catching duo in the NL of 2010, while giving highly touted prospect Devin Mesoraco more time to develop in the minors. They also resigned another veteran in backup corner infielder Miguel Cairo. Jocketty brought in two young outfielders on minor league deals, Brian Barton and Jeremy Hermida. Hermida was invited to spring training. The Reds also signed former phenom pitcher and 2003 Rookie of the Year Dontrelle Willis to a minor league deal, also giving him a spring training invite. Then on January 7, the Reds made their biggest acquisition of the off-season, signing the current World Series MVP, veteran shortstop Édgar Rentería. GM Walt Jocketty has stated that Rentería will be in a backup role to Janish. On January 10, the Reds signed left fielder Fred Lewis for $900 K. He is expected to, at the very least, platoon with Gomes in left field.  On January 16, it was announced that the Reds and Joey Votto agreed to a 3-year, $38 million deal.

Regular season
The Reds opened the 2011 season with a walk-off home run against division rival Milwaukee to win on opening day 7–6 which eventually propelled them to a 5–0 start to the season, their best start since 1990 (the year which they last won the World Series).  Throughout the months of April and May the Reds were either near the lead or the leader of the NL Central division.  May also saw a three-game series sweep of the rival St. Louis Cardinals, the Reds first sweep of the Cardinals since 2007.  In June, the Reds continued to stay in the division race finishing the month with a 42–40 record.  July started off poorly for the Reds who currently sit in fourth place in the division where they stayed through the week following the All-Star break. They would eventually finish the season in 3rd place with a 79-83 record

Standings

Record vs. opponents

Game log

|- align="center" bgcolor="bbffbb"
| 1 || March 31 || Brewers || FSO || W 7–6 || Ondrusek (1–0) || Axford (0–1) || || 42,398 || 1–0 || 
|- align="center" bgcolor="bbffbb"
| 2 || April 2 || Brewers || FSO || W 4–2 || Wood (1–0) || Marcum (0–1) || Cordero (1) || 37,967 || 2–0 || 
|- align="center" bgcolor="bbffbb"
| 3 || April 3 || Brewers || FSO || W 12–3 || Arroyo (1–0) || Wolf (0–1) || || 24,805 || 3–0 || 
|- align="center" bgcolor="bbffbb"
| 4 || April 5 || Astros || FSO || W 8–2 || Leake (1–0) || Happ (0–1) || || 11,821 || 4–0 || 
|- align="center" bgcolor="bbffbb"
| 5 || April 6 || Astros || FSO || W 12–4 || Vólquez (1–0) || Figueroa (0–1) || || 17,719 || 5–0 || 
|- align="center" bgcolor="ffbbbb"
| 6 || April 7 || Astros || FSO || L 2–3 || Abad (1–0) || Masset (0–1) || Lyon (1) || 20,014 || 5–1 || 
|- align="center" bgcolor="ffbbbb"
| 7 || April 8 || @ Diamondbacks || FSO || L 2–13 || Kennedy (1–0) || Wood (1–1) || || 48,030 || 5–2 || 
|- align="center" bgcolor="bbffbb"
| 8 || April 9 || @ Diamondbacks || FSO || W 6–1 || Arroyo (2–0) || Hudson (0–2) || || 20,729 || 6–2 || 
|- align="center" bgcolor="ffbbbb"
| 9 || April 10 || @ Diamondbacks || FSO || L 8–10 || Heilman (1–0) || Masset (0–2) || Putz (3) || 19,728 || 6–3 || 
|- align="center" bgcolor="bbffbb"
| 10 || April 11 || @ Padres || FSO || W 3–2 || Vólquez (2–0) || Latos (0–1) || Cordero (2) || 18,022 || 7–3 || 
|- align="center" bgcolor="bbffbb"
| 11 || April 12 || @ Padres || FSO || W 8–2 (11) || Ondrusek (2–0) || Luebke (0–1) || || 17,379 || 8–3 || 
|- align="center" bgcolor="ffbbbb"
| 12 || April 13 || @ Padres || FSO || L 2–3 || Bell (1–0) || Masset (0–3) || || 17,057 || 8–4 || 
|- align="center" bgcolor="ffbbbb"
| 13 || April 15 || Pirates || FSO || L 1–6 || Morton (2–0) || Arroyo (2–1) || || 21,312 || 8–5 || 
|- align="center" bgcolor="bbffbb"
| 14 || April 16 || Pirates || FSO || W 11–2 || Leake (2–0) || McDonald (0–1) || || 26,418 || 9–5 || 
|- align="center" bgcolor="ffbbbb"
| 15 || April 17 || Pirates || FSO || L 6–7 || Resop (1–0) || Ondrusek (2–1) || Hanrahan (5) || 32,105 || 9–6 || 
|- align="center" bgcolor="ffbbbb"
| 16 || April 18 || Pirates || FSO || L 3–9 || Correia (3–1) || Wood (1–2) || || 12,777 || 9–7 || 
|- align="center" bgcolor="ffbbbb"
| 17 || April 19 || Diamondbacks || FSO || L 4–5 || Galarraga (3–0) || LeCure (0–1) || Putz (4) || 12,994 || 9–8 || 
|- align="center" bgcolor="ffbbbb"
| 18 || April 20 || Diamondbacks || FSO || L 1–3 || Kennedy (2–1) || Arroyo (2–2) || Putz (5) || 14,915 || 9–9 || 
|- align="center" bgcolor="bbffbb"
| 19 || April 21 || Diamondbacks || MLBN || W 7–4 || Leake (3–0) || Hudson (0–4) || || 17,319 || 10–9 || 
|- align="center" bgcolor="ffbbbb"
| 20 || April 22 || @ Cardinals || FSO || L 2–4 || McClellan (3–0) || Maloney (0–1) || Boggs (2) || 40,327 || 10–10 || 
|- align="center" bgcolor="bbffbb"
| 21 || April 23 || @ Cardinals || Fox || W 5–3 || Chapman (1–0) || Batista (1–1) || Cordero (3) || 41,877 || 11–10 || 
|- align="center" bgcolor="ffbbbb"
| 22 || April 24 || @ Cardinals || ESPN || L 0–3 || Westbrook (2–2) || Vólquez (2–1) || Boggs (3) || 38,201 || 11–11 || 
|- align="center" bgcolor="bbffbb"
| 23 || April 25 || @ Brewers || FSO || W 9–5 || Arroyo (3–2) || Narveson (1–1) || || 35,794 || 12–11 || 
|- align="center" bgcolor="ffbbbb"
| 24 || April 26 || @ Brewers || FSO || L 2–3 || Loe (2–1) || Ondrusek (2–2) || Axford (5) || 37,062 || 12–12 || 
|- align="center" bgcolor="bbffbb"
| 25 || April 27 || @ Brewers || FSO || W 7–6 (10) || Chapman (2–0) || Mitre (0–1) || Cordero (4) || 33,848 || 13–12 || 
|- align="center" bgcolor="ffbbbb"
| 26 || April 29 || Marlins || FSO || L 6–7 || Vázquez (2–2) || Wood (1–3) || Oviedo (8) || 27,051 || 13–13 || 
|- align="center" bgcolor="bbffbb"
| 27 || April 30 || Marlins || FSO || W 4–3 (10) || Cordero (1–0) || Dunn (1–1) || || 40,286 || 14–13 || 

|- align="center" bgcolor="ffbbbb"
| 28 || May 1 || Marlins || FSO || L 5–9 || Nolasco (3–0) || Arroyo (3–3) || Oviedo (9) || 26,941 || 14–14 || 
|- align="center" bgcolor="bbbbbb"
| – || May 2 || Astros ||colspan=8 | Postponed (rain);  Makeup: May 5
|- align="center" bgcolor="ffbbbb"
| 29 || May 3 || Astros || FSO || L 4–10 || Happ (2–4) || Leake (3–1) || || 12,005 || 14–15 || 
|- align="center" bgcolor="bbffbb"
| 30 || May 4 || Astros || || W 3–2 || Cordero (2–0) || Lyon (3–2) || || 12,340 || 15–15 || 
|- align="center" bgcolor="bbffbb"
| 31 || May 5 || Astros || FSO || W 10–4 || Bailey (1–0) || Myers (1–2) || || 14,765 || 16–15 || 
|- align="center" bgcolor="bbffbb"
| 32 || May 6 || @ Cubs || FSO || W 5–4 || Vólquez (3–1) || Garza (1–4) || Cordero (5) || 35,471 || 17–15 || 
|- align="center" bgcolor="ffbbbb"
| 33 || May 7 || @ Cubs || Fox || L 2–3 || Mateo (1–1) || Cordero (2–1) || || 37,666 || 17–16 || 
|- align="center" bgcolor="bbffbb"
| 34 || May 8 || @ Cubs || FSO || W 2–0 || Cueto (1–0) || Dempster (1–4) || Cordero (6) || 31,931 || 18–16 || 
|- align="center" bgcolor="bbffbb"
| 35 || May 9 || @ Astros || FSO || W 6–1 || Wood (2–3) || Rodríguez (0–1) || || 20,174 || 19–16 || 
|- align="center" bgcolor="bbffbb"
| 36 || May 10 || @ Astros || FSO || W 7–3 || Bailey (2–0) || Myers (1–3) || || 24,499 || 20–16 || 
|- align="center" bgcolor="ffbbbb"
| 37 || May 11 || @ Astros || FSO || L 3–4 || Melancon (3–1) || Leake (3–2) || || 21,008 || 20–17 || 
|- align="center" bgcolor="bbffbb"
| 38 || May 13 || Cardinals || FSO || W 6–5 (10) || Cordero (3–1) || Motte (1–1) || || 32,972 || 21–17 || 
|- align="center" bgcolor="bbffbb"
| 39 || May 14 || Cardinals || FSO || W 7–3 || Cueto (2–0) || McClellan (5–1) || || 41,307 || 22–17 || 
|- align="center" bgcolor="bbffbb"
| 40 || May 15 || Cardinals || FSO || W 9–7 || Wood (3–3) || Carpenter (1–3) || Cordero (7) || 24,672 || 23–17 || 
|- align="center" bgcolor="bbffbb"
| 41 || May 16 || Cubs || FSO || W 7–4 || Bailey (3–0) || Zambrano (4–2) || Cordero (8) || 16,981 || 24–17 || 
|- align="center" bgcolor="bbffbb"
| 42 || May 17 || Cubs || FSO || W 7–5 || Bray (1–0) || Wood (1–3) || Masset (1) || 18,861 || 25–17 || 
|- align="center" bgcolor="ffbbbb"
| 43 || May 18 || Pirates || FSO || L 0–5 || Morton (5–1) || Arroyo (3–4) || || 16,543 || 25–18 || 
|- align="center" bgcolor="ffbbbb"
| 44 || May 19 || Pirates || MLBN || L 3–5 || McDonald (3–3) || Cueto (2–1) || Hanrahan (12) || 26,018 || 25–19 || 
|- align="center" bgcolor="ffbbbb"
| 45 || May 20 || @ Indians || FSO || L 4–5 || Pestano (1–0) || Bray (1–1) || Perez (11) || 31,622 || 25–20 || 
|- align="center" bgcolor="ffbbbb"
| 46 || May 21 || @ Indians || FSO || L 1–2 || Tomlin (6–1) || Bailey (3–1) || Perez (12) || 40,631 || 25–21 || 
|- align="center" bgcolor="ffbbbb"
| 47 || May 22 || @ Indians || FSO || L 4–12 || Carrasco (3–2) || Vólquez (3–2) || || 26,833 || 25–22 || 
|- align="center" bgcolor="ffbbbb"
| 48 || May 23 || @ Phillies || FSO || L 3–10 || Hamels (6–2) || Arroyo (3–5) || || 45,841 || 25–23 || 
|- align="center" bgcolor="bbffbb"
| 49 || May 24 || @ Phillies || FSO || W 6–3 || Ondrusek (3–2) || Madson (2–1) || Cordero (9) || 45,740 || 26–23 || 
|- align="center" bgcolor="ffbbbb"
| 50 || May 25 || @ Phillies || FSO || L 4–5 (19) || Valdez (1–0) || Fisher (0–1) || || 45,706 || 26–24 || 
|- align="center" bgcolor="ffbbbb"
| 51 || May 26 || @ Phillies || FSO || L 4–10 || Lee (4–4) || Thompson (0–1) || || 45,650 || 26–25 || 
|- align="center" bgcolor="bbffbb"
| 52 || May 27 || @ Braves || FSO || W 5–1 || Leake (4–2) || Hanson (5–4) || || 30,701 || 27–25 || 
|- align="center" bgcolor="ffbbbb"
| 53 || May 28 || @ Braves || Fox || L 6–7 (12) || Linebrink (1–1) || Fisher (0–2) || || 36,615 || 27–26 || 
|- align="center" bgcolor="ffbbbb"
| 54 || May 29 || @ Braves || ESPN2 || L 1–2 || Jurrjens (7–1) || Cueto (2–2) || Kimbrel (15) || 36,392 || 27–27 || 
|- align="center" bgcolor="bbffbb"
| 55 || May 30 || Brewers || FSO || W 7–3 || Wood (4–3) || Narveson (2–4) || || 21,564 || 28–27 || 
|- align="center" bgcolor="ffbbbb"
| 56 || May 31 || Brewers || FSO || L 2–7 || Greinke (4–1) || Reineke (0–1) || || 14,294 || 28–28 || 
|-

|- align="center" bgcolor="bbffbb"
| 57 || June 1 || Brewers || FSO || W 4–3 || Masset (1–3) || Loe (2–5) || Cordero (10) || 22,213 || 29–28 || 
|- align="center" bgcolor="bbffbb"
| 58 || June 3 || Dodgers || FSO || W 2–1 || Arroyo (4–5) || Kuroda (5–6) || Cordero (11) || 31,402 || 30–28 || 
|- align="center" bgcolor="ffbbbb"
| 59 || June 4 || Dodgers || Fox || L 8–11 (11) || Guerra (1–0) || Fisher (0–3) || || 40,234 || 30–29 || 
|- align="center" bgcolor="ffbbbb"
| 60 || June 5 || Dodgers || FSO || L 6–9 || Billingsley (5–4) || Wood (4–4) || || 28,327 || 30–30 || 
|- align="center" bgcolor="bbffbb"
| 61 || June 6 || Cubs || FSO || W 8–2 || Leake (5–2) || Garza (2–5) || || 22,568 || 31–30 || 
|- align="center" bgcolor="bbffbb"
| 62 || June 7 || Cubs || FSO || W 8–2 || Vólquez (4–2) || Davis (0–5) || || 24,921 || 32–30 || 
|- align="center" bgcolor="ffbbbb"
| 63 || June 8 || Cubs || FSO || L 1–4 || Dempster (5–5) || Arroyo (4–6) || Mármol (11) || 31,367 || 32–31 || 
|- align="center" bgcolor="bbffbb"
| 64 || June 9 || @ Giants || FSO || W 3–0 || Cueto (3–2) || Bumgarner (2–8) || Cordero (12) || 41,106 || 33–31 || 
|- align="center" bgcolor="ffbbbb"
| 65 || June 10 || @ Giants || FSO || L 2–3 || Wilson (5–1) || Arredondo (0–1) || || 41,686 || 33–32 || 
|- align="center" bgcolor="bbffbb"
| 66 || June 11 || @ Giants || Fox || W 10–2 || Leake (6–2) || Lincecum (5–5) || || 41,735 || 34–32 || 
|- align="center" bgcolor="ffbbbb"
| 67 || June 12 || @ Giants || ESPN || L 2–4 || Ramírez (2–0) || Arredondo (0–2) || Wilson (18) || 42,084 || 34–33 || 
|- align="center" bgcolor="bbffbb"
| 68 || June 13 || @ Dodgers || FSO || W 6–4 || Arroyo (5–6) || Kuroda (5–8) || Cordero (13) || 31,372 || 35–33 || 
|- align="center" bgcolor="bbffbb"
| 69 || June 14 || @ Dodgers || FSO || W 3–2 || Cueto (4–2) || Hawksworth (1–2) || Cordero (14) || 39,233 || 36–33 || 
|- align="center" bgcolor="bbffbb"
| 70 || June 15 || @ Dodgers || FSO || W 7–2 || Wood (5–4) || Billingsley (5–6) || || 30,433 || 37–33 || 
|- align="center" bgcolor="ffbbbb"
| 71 || June 17 || Blue Jays || FSO || L 2–3 || Reyes (3–5) || Leake (6–3) || Francisco (7) || 32,026 || 37–34 || 
|- align="center" bgcolor="ffbbbb"
| 72 || June 18 || Blue Jays || FSO || L 0–4 || Morrow (3–4) || Vólquez (4–3) || || 31,688 || 37–35 || 
|- align="center" bgcolor="bbffbb"
| 73 || June 19 || Blue Jays || FSO || W 2–1 || Arroyo (6–6) || Villanueva (4–1) || Cordero (15) || 32,618 || 38–35 || 
|- align="center" bgcolor="ffbbbb"
| 74 || June 20 || Yankees || FSO || L 3–5 || Nova (7–4) || Wood (5–5) || Rivera (18) || 41,173 || 38–36 || 
|- align="center" bgcolor="bbbbbb"
| – || June 21 || Yankees || FSO ||colspan=8 | Postponed (rain); Makeup: June 22 (Game 2)
|- align="center" bgcolor="ffbbbb"
| 75 || June 22 || Yankees || FSO || L 2–4 || García (6–6) || Leake (6–4) || Rivera (19) || 40,040 || 38–37 || 
|- align="center" bgcolor="bbffbb"
| 76 || June 22 || Yankees || FSO || W 10–2 || Cueto (5–2) || Gordon (0–1) || || 41,367 || 39–37 || 
|- align="center" bgcolor="ffbbbb"
| 77 || June 24 || @ Orioles || FSO || L 4–5 (12) || Gonzalez (1–1) || Arredondo (0–3) || || 45,382 || 39–38 || 
|- align="center" bgcolor="bbffbb"
| 78 || June 25 || @ Orioles || FSO || W 10–5 || Arroyo (7–6) || Matusz (1–3) || || 38,976 || 40–38 || 
|- align="center" bgcolor="ffbbbb"
| 79 || June 26 || @ Orioles || FSO || L 5–7 || Guthrie (3–9) || Bailey (3–2) || Gregg (14) || 27,809 || 40–39 || 
|- align="center" bgcolor="bbffbb"
| 80 || June 27 || @ Rays || FSO || W 5–0 || Leake (7–4) || Hellickson (7–7) || || 19,891 || 41–39 || 
|- align="center" bgcolor="ffbbbb"
| 81 || June 28 || @ Rays || FSO || L 3–4 || Farnsworth (3–1) || Ondrusek (3–3) || || 20,894 || 41–40 || 
|- align="center" bgcolor="bbffbb"
| 82 || June 29 || @ Rays || FSO || W 4–3 || Vólquez (5–3) || Shields (8–5) || Cordero (16) || 25,968 || 42–40 || 
|-

|- align="center" bgcolor="ffbbbb"
| 83 || July 1 || Indians || FSO || L 2–8 || Masterson (6–6) || Arroyo (7–7) || || 40,440 || 42–41 || 
|- align="center" bgcolor="ffbbbb"
| 84 || July 2 || Indians || Fox || L 1–3 || Herrmann (1–0) || Bailey (3–3) || Pestano (1) || 41,580 || 42–42 || 
|- align="center" bgcolor="bbffbb"
| 85 || July 3 || Indians || FSO || W 7–5 || Leake (8–4) || Talbot (2–5) || Cordero (17) || 34,948 || 43–42 || 
|- align="center" bgcolor="ffbbbb"
| 86 || July 4 || @ Cardinals || FSO || L 0–1 || Carpenter (4–7) || Cueto (5–3) || Salas (15) || 40,551 || 43–43 || 
|- align="center" bgcolor="ffbbbb"
| 87 || July 5 || @ Cardinals || FSO || L 1–8 || García (8–3) || Vólquez (5–4) || || 36,090 || 43–44 || 
|- align="center" bgcolor="bbffbb"
| 88 || July 6 || @ Cardinals || FSO || W 9–8 (13) || Arredondo (1–3) || Valdés (0–1) || Chapman (1) || 37,223 || 44–44 || 
|- align="center" bgcolor="ffbbbb"
| 89 || July 7 || @ Brewers || FSO || L 4–5 || Narveson (6–5) || Bailey (3–4) || Axford (23) || 34,102 || 44–45 || 
|- align="center" bgcolor="ffbbbb"
| 90 || July 8 || @ Brewers || FSO || L 7–8 || Estrada (2–5) || Cordero (3–2) || || 39,050 || 44–46 || 
|- align="center" bgcolor="bbffbb"
| 91 || July 9 || @ Brewers || FSO || W 8–4 (10) || Bray (2–1) || Estrada (2–6) || || 43,119 || 45–46 || 
|- align="center" bgcolor="ffbbbb"
| 92 || July 10 || @ Brewers || FSO || L 3–4 || Loe (3–7) || Cordero (3–3) || || 43,896 || 45–47 || 
|- style="text-align:center;"
| colspan="11" style="background:#bbcaff;"|July 12: 2011 MLB All-Star Game – Phoenix, Arizona at Chase Field 
|- align="center" bgcolor="bbffbb"
| 93 || July 15 || Cardinals || FSO || W 6–5 || Ondrusek (4–3) || Salas (5–3) || || 41,238 || 46–47 || 
|- align="center" bgcolor="ffbbbb"
| 94 || July 16 || Cardinals || FSO || L 1–4 || Carpenter (5–7) || Arroyo (7–8) || Salas (17) || 40,204 || 46–48 || 
|- align="center" bgcolor="bbffbb"
| 95 || July 17 || Cardinals || FSO || W 3–1 || Bailey (4–4) || García (9–4) || Cordero (18) || 24,841 || 47–48 || 
|- align="center" bgcolor="ffbbbb"
| 96 || July 18 || @ Pirates || FSO || L 0–2 || Morton (8–5) || Willis (0–1) || Hanrahan (27) || 22,016 || 47–49 || 
|- align="center" bgcolor="ffbbbb"
| 97 || July 19 || @ Pirates || FSO || L 0–1 || McDonald (6–4) || Leake (8–5) || Hanrahan (28) || 26,058 || 47–50 || 
|- align="center" bgcolor="bbffbb"
| 98 || July 20 || @ Pirates || FSO || W 3–1 || Cueto (6–3) || Karstens (8–5) || Cordero (19) || 25,207 || 48–50 || 
|- align="center" bgcolor="ffbbbb"
| 99 || July 22 || Braves || FSO || L 4–6 || Venters (5–1) || Masset (1–4) || Kimbrel (31) || 34,118 || 48–51 || 
|- align="center" bgcolor="bbffbb"
| 100 || July 23 || Braves || Fox || W 11–2 || Bailey (5–4) || Lowe (6–8) || || 41,192 || 49–51 || 
|- align="center" bgcolor="bbffbb"
| 101 || July 24 || Braves || ESPN || W 4–3 || Cordero (4–3) || Linebrink (3–2) || || 33,036 || 50–51 || 
|- align="center" bgcolor="ffbbbb"
| 102 || July 25 || Mets || FSO || L 2–4 || Dickey (5–8) || Leake (8–6) || Isringhausen (3) || 25,480 || 50–52 || 
|- align="center" bgcolor="ffbbbb"
| 103 || July 26 || Mets || FSO || L 6–8 || Niese (10–8) || Cueto (6–4) || Byrdak (1) || 27,552 || 50–53 || 
|- align="center" bgcolor="ffbbbb"
| 104 || July 27 || Mets || FSO || L 2–8 || Pelfrey (6–9) || Arroyo (7–9) || || 23,616 || 50–54 || 
|- align="center" bgcolor="ffbbbb"
| 105 || July 28 || Mets || FSO || L 9–10 || Capuano (9–10) || Bailey (5–5) || Isringhausen (4) || 25,400 || 50–55 || 
|- align="center" bgcolor="bbffbb"
| 106 || July 29 || Giants || FSO || W 4–3 (13) || Arredondo (2–3) || Wilson (6–3) || || 29,016 || 51–55 || 
|- align="center" bgcolor="bbffbb"
| 107 || July 30 || Giants || FSO || W 7–2 || Leake (9–6) || Bumgarner (6–10) || || 40,402 || 52–55 || 
|- align="center" bgcolor="bbffbb"
| 108 || July 31 || Giants || FSO || W 9–0 || Cueto (7–4) || Zito (3–4) || || 37,864 || 53–55 || 
|-

|- align="center" bgcolor="ffbbbb"
| 109 || August 1 || @ Astros || FSO || L 3–4 (10) || Melancon (6–3) || Ondrusek (4–4) || || 21,502 || 53–56 || 
|- align="center" bgcolor="bbffbb"
| 110 || August 2 || @ Astros || FSO || W 5–1 || Bailey (6–5) || Rodríguez (7–8) || || 22,603 || 54–56 || 
|- align="center" bgcolor="ffbbbb"
| 111 || August 3 || @ Astros || FSO || L 4–5 || Lyles (1–6) || Masset (1–5) || Melancon (11) || 22,102 || 54–57 || 
|- align="center" bgcolor="ffbbbb"
| 112 || August 5 || @ Cubs || FSO || L 3–4 || Dempster (9–8) || Leake (9–7) || Mármol (24) || 42,245 || 54–58 || 
|- align="center" bgcolor="ffbbbb"
| 113 || August 6 || @ Cubs || FSO || L 4–11 || Zambrano (9–6) || Cueto (7–5) || || 41,978 || 54–59 || 
|- align="center" bgcolor="bbffbb"
| 114 || August 7 || @ Cubs || FSO || W 8–7 || Masset (2–5) || Marshall (5–5) || Cordero (20) || 39,619 || 55–59 || 
|- align="center" bgcolor="ffbbbb"
| 115 || August 8 || Rockies || FSO || L 7–10 || Belisle (6–4) || Bray (2–2) || Street (29) || 27,055 || 55–60 || 
|- align="center" bgcolor="ffbbbb"
| 116 || August 9 || Rockies || FSO || L 2–3 || Rogers (6–1) || Willis (0–2) || Betancourt (1) || 17,378 || 55–61 || 
|- align="center" bgcolor="bbffbb"
| 117 || August 10 || Rockies || FSO || W 3–2 || Leake (10–7) || Millwood (0–1) || Cordero (21) || 21,673 || 56–61 || 
|- align="center" bgcolor="bbffbb"
| 118 || August 11 || Rockies || FSO || W 2–1 || Cueto (8–5) || Chacín (9–9) || Cordero (22) || 20,546 || 57–61 || 
|- align="center" bgcolor="bbffbb"
| 119 || August 12 || Padres || FSO || W 5–3 || Bray (3–2) || Spence (0–1) || Cordero (23) || 28,346 || 58–61 || 
|- align="center" bgcolor="bbffbb"
| 120 || August 13 || Padres || FSO || W 13–1 || Bailey (7–5) || Stauffer (7–9) || || 31,374 || 59–61 || 
|- align="center" bgcolor="ffbbbb"
| 121 || August 14 || Padres || FSO || L 3–7 || LeBlanc (1–2) || Willis (0–3) || || 35,286 || 59–62 || 
|- align="center" bgcolor="ffbbbb"
| 122 || August 16 || @ Nationals || FSO || L 4–6 || Wang (2–2) || Leake (10–8) || Storen (32) || 23,888 || 59–63 || 
|- align="center" bgcolor="bbffbb"
| 123 || August 17 || @ Nationals || FSO || W 2–1 || Cueto (9–5) || Detwiler (1–3) || Cordero (24) || 20,374 || 60–63 || 
|- align="center" bgcolor="ffbbbb"
| 124 || August 18 || @ Nationals || FSO || L 1–3 || Zimmermann (8–10) || Arroyo (7–10) || Storen (33) || 19,508 || 60–64 || 
|- align="center" bgcolor="bbffbb"
| 125 || August 19 || @ Pirates || FSO || W 11–8 || Wood (6–5) || Hanrahan (0–2) || Cordero (25) || 36,620 || 61–64 || 
|- align="center" bgcolor="ffbbbb"
| 126 || August 20 || @ Pirates || Fox || L 3–5 || Watson (1–2) || Chapman (2–1) || Hanrahan (31) || 37,826 || 61–65 || 
|- align="center" bgcolor="bbffbb"
| 127 || August 21 || @ Pirates || FSO || W 5–4 || Arredondo (3–3) || Hanrahan (0–3) || Cordero (26) || 29,967 || 62–65 || 
|- align="center" bgcolor="bbffbb"
| 128 || August 23 || @ Marlins || FSO || W 8–6 || Chapman (3–1) || Oviedo (1–4) || Cordero (27) || 21,204 || 63–65 || 
|- align="center" bgcolor="ffbbbb"
| 129 || August 24 || @ Marlins || FSO || L 5–6 || Webb (2–4) || Arredondo (3–4) || Cishek (2) || || 63–66 || 
|- align="center" bgcolor="bbffbb"
| 130 || August 24 || @ Marlins || FSO || W 3–2 || Arroyo (8–10) || Volstad (5–11) || Cordero (28) || 22,505 || 64–66 || 
|- align="center" bgcolor="bbbbbb"
| – || August 25 || @ Marlins ||colspan=9|Postponed (impending weather); Played on August 24 (Game 2)
|- align="center" bgcolor="bbffbb"
| 131 || August 26 || Nationals || FSO || W 4–3 || Cordero (5–3) || Balester (1–2) || || 35,089 || 65–66 || 
|- align="center" bgcolor="bbffbb"
| 132 || August 27 || Nationals || FSO || W 6–3 || Leake (11–8) || Detwiler (2–4) || Cordero (29) || 30,423 || 66–66 || 
|- align="center" bgcolor="bbffbb"
| 133 || August 28 || Nationals || FSO || W 5–4 (14) || Bray (4–2) || Balester (1–3) || || 28,415 || 67–66 || 
|- align="center" bgcolor="ffbbbb"
| 134 || August 29 || Phillies || FSO || L 2–3 || Bastardo (6–0) || Bailey (7–6) || Madson (24) || 21,360 || 67–67 || 
|- align="center" bgcolor="ffbbbb"
| 135 || August 30 || Phillies || FSO || L 0–9 || Halladay (16–5) || Arroyo (8–11) || || 19,317 || 67–68 || 
|- align="center" bgcolor="ffbbbb"
| 136 || August 31 || Phillies || FSO || L 0–3 || Lee (15–7) || Willis (0–4) || Madson (25) || 18,567 || 67–69 || 
|-

|- align="center" bgcolor="ffbbbb"
| 137 || September 1 || Phillies || FSO || L 4–6 || Worley (10–1) || Leake (11–9) || Madson (26) || 21,438 || 67–70 || 
|- align="center" bgcolor="bbffbb"
| 138 || September 2 || @ Cardinals || FSO || W 11–8 || Arredondo (4–4) || Rzepczynski (2–4) || || 36,970 || 68–70 || 
|- align="center" bgcolor="ffbbbb"
| 139 || September 3 || @ Cardinals || Fox || L 4–6 || García (11–7) || Bailey (7–7) || Motte (2) || 41,839 || 68–71 || 
|- align="center" bgcolor="bbffbb"
| 140 || September 4 || @ Cardinals || FSO || W 3–2 (10) || Bray (5–2) || Salas (5–6) || Cordero (30) || 41,647 || 69–71 || 
|- align="center" bgcolor="ffbbbb"
| 141 || September 5 || @ Cubs || FSO || L 3–4 || Garza (8–10) || Willis (0–5) || Mármol (32) || 41,341 || 69–72 || 
|- align="center" bgcolor="bbffbb"
| 142 || September 6 || @ Cubs || FSO || W 4–2 (13) || Chapman (4–1) || Grabow (3–1) || Cordero (31) || 35,297 || 70–72 || 
|- align="center" bgcolor="ffbbbb"
| 143 || September 7 || @ Cubs || FSO || L 3–6 || Wood (2–5) || Ondrusek (4–5) || Mármol (33) || 36,797 || 70–73 || 
|- align="center" bgcolor="bbffbb"
| 144 || September 9 || @ Rockies || FSO || W 4–1 || Bailey (8–7) || Chacín (11–11) || Cordero (32) || 39,933 || 71–73 || 
|- align="center" bgcolor="ffbbbb"
| 145 || September 10 || @ Rockies || || L 7–12 || White (3–1) || Maloney (0–2) || || 38,407 || 71–74 || 
|- align="center" bgcolor="ffbbbb"
| 146 || September 11 || @ Rockies || FSO || L 1–4 || Pomeranz (1–0) || Vólquez (5–5) || Hammel (1) || 39,240 || 71–75 || 
|- align="center" bgcolor="ffbbbb"
| 147 || September 12 || Cubs || FSO || L 8–12 || López (5–6) || Willis (0–6) || || 19,874 || 71–76 || 
|- align="center" bgcolor="bbffbb"
| 148 || September 13 || Cubs || FSO || W 2–1 || Leake (12–9) || Dempster (10–12) || Cordero (33) || 19,159 || 72–76 || 
|- align="center" bgcolor="bbffbb"
| 149 || September 14 || Cubs || FSO || W 7–2 || LeCure (1–1) || Coleman (2–8) || || 18,304 || 73–76 || 
|- align="center" bgcolor="bbffbb"
| 150 || September 15 || Cubs || FSO || W 8–6 (11) || Masset (3–5) || Russell (1–6) || || 23,792 || 74–76 || 
|- align="center" bgcolor="ffbbbb"
| 151 || September 16 || Brewers || FSO || L 3–6 || Wolf (13–9) || Arroyo (8–12) || Axford (43) || 32,506 || 74–77 || 
|- align="center" bgcolor="ffbbbb"
| 152 || September 17 || Brewers || FSO || L 1–10 || Gallardo (17–10) || Vólquez (5–6) || || 39,766 || 74–78 || 
|- align="center" bgcolor="ffbbbb"
| 153 || September 18 || Brewers || FSO || L 1–8 || Greinke (15–6) || Maloney (0–3) || || 37,845 || 74–79 || 
|- align="center" bgcolor="ffbbbb"
| 154 || September 19 || Astros || FSO || L 2–3 || Carpenter (1–3) || Masset (3–6) || Melancon (19) || 21,168 || 74–80 || 
|- align="center" bgcolor="bbffbb"
| 155 || September 20 || Astros || FSO || W 6–4 || Bailey (9–7) || Norris (6–11) || Cordero (34) || 23,847 || 75–80 || 
|- align="center" bgcolor="bbffbb"
| 156 || September 21 || Astros || FSO || W 2–0 || Arroyo (9–12) || Rodríguez (11–11) || || 20,875 || 76–80 || 
|- align="center" bgcolor="ffbbbb"
| 157 || September 23 || @ Pirates || FSO || L 3–4 || Hanrahan (1–4) || Bray (5–3) || || 23,632 || 76–81 || 
|- align="center" bgcolor="ffbbbb"
| 158 || September 24 || @ Pirates || FSO || L 3–4 || Lincoln (2–3) || Wood (6–6) || Grilli (1) || 37,388 || 76–82 || 
|- align="center" bgcolor="bbffbb"
| 159 || September 25 || @ Pirates || FSO || W 5–4 || Willis (1–6) || Moskos (1–1) || Cordero (35) || 28,758 || 77–82 || 
|- align="center" bgcolor="bbffbb"
| 160 || September 26 || @ Mets || FSO || W 6–5 || Ondrusek (5–5) || Byrdak (2–1) || Cordero (36) || 28,651 || 78–82 || 
|- align="center" bgcolor="bbffbb"
| 161 || September 27 || @ Mets || FSO || W 5–4 (13) || LeCure (2–1) || Thayer (0–3) || Cordero (37) || 30,027 || 79–82 || 
|- align="center" bgcolor="ffbbbb"
| 162 || September 28 || @ Mets || FSO || L 0–3 || Batista (5–2) || Vólquez (5–7) || || 28,816 || 79–83 || 

|-
|

Roster

Player stats

Batting
Note: Pos = Position; G = Games played; AB = At bats; H = Hits; Avg. = Batting average; HR = Home runs; RBI = Runs batted in

Stats through September 28, 2011

Pitching

Starting pitchers
Note: G = Games pitched ; IP = Innings pitched ; W = Wins ; L = Losses ; ERA = Earned run average ; SO = Strikeouts ; WHIP = Walks and hits per inning pitched

Stats through September 28, 2011

Relief pitchers
Note: G = Games pitched; W = Wins; L = Losses; SV = Saves; IP = Innings pitched; ERA = Earned run average; SO = Strikeouts; WHIP = Walks and hits per inning pitched

Stats through September 28, 2011

Farm System

Minor league standings
Standings as of: September 14, 2011

References

External links
Official Website
2011 Cincinnati Reds at Baseball Reference

Cincinnati Reds seasons
Cincinnati Reds
Cinc